George Gilchrist McGowan (1890-1970) was a pioneer rugby league footballer in the New South Wales Rugby League.

McGowan, a half-back, joined Easts Juniors in 1911 as a 20-year-old. He played Presidents Cup with Easts in 1913 and played first grade with Eastern Suburbs in the 1915 season.

He then joined South Sydney for three seasons between 1916 and 1918. George McGowan played in the 1916 Premiership Final for Souths.

McGowan finished his Rugby League career at Western Suburbs, where he played three seasons: 1919, 1920 and 1922. He coached the Young, New South Wales Rugby League team in 1925.

A long time resident of Macquarie Fields, New South Wales, he died there on 8 March 1970, age 79.

References

 The Eastern Suburbs website

1890 births
1970 deaths
Australian rugby league players
Sydney Roosters players
South Sydney Rabbitohs players
Rugby league halfbacks
Rugby league five-eighths
Rugby league players from Sydney
Western Suburbs Magpies players
South Sydney Rabbitohs captains